Kiyohiko (written: 清彦, 虚彦 or きよひこ in hiragana) is a masculine Japanese given name. Notable people with the name include:

, Japanese manga artist
, Japanese actor
, Japanese politician
, Japanese film director
, Japanese singer

Japanese masculine given names